Chaliwa is an album by Jamie Saft's New Zion Trio which was released on the Veal label in 2013.

Reception

In his review for PopMatters, Sean Murphy notes that "the trio manages to pull off a variety of sounds, ranging from narcotic lounge music (in a good way) to traditional piano jazz (think Bill Evans by way of Kingston) and darker-than-dread reggae meditations. On Chaliwa, the players double down on the dub, and the results are every bit as satisfying this time out".

Track listing
All compositions by Jamie Saft except as indicated
 "Twelve Tribes" – 6:21
 "Temples" – 8:53 		
 "Chant It Down" (H.R., Jamie Saft, Craig Santiago) – 6:36
 "Negus" – 8:16
 "Pinkus" – 5:34 		
 "Zion Heights" – 7:10
 "Cherub Dub" – 5:55
 "Rasta Lion Dub" – 9:52
 "King's Bread" – 7:59

Personnel
Jamie Saft – piano, Fender Rhodes
Brad Jones – bass 
Craig Santiago – drums 
H.R. – vocals (track 3)

References

Jamie Saft albums
2013 albums